Mukhura Waterfall Natural Monument is a waterfall with a height of 60-70 m at 882 m above sea level in Tkibuli Municipality, Imereti region of Georgia.  Water flows from the cave located on the slope of eastern exposure and forms a three step waterfall. Inside the cave there is one small and one big lake. There also flows of a pristine river inside the cave, which locals refer to as Tskalmechkheri (shallow water). The banks of the waterfall are covered in mixed broadleaf forest. The place is home to many endemic species, such as Caucasian mole, Volnukhin and Caucasian water shrew. Ten different kinds of bats live in the cave.

See also 
 List of natural monuments of Georgia

References

Natural monuments of Georgia (country)
Waterfalls of Georgia (country)